Viktorija Vengreviča (born 6 August 1997) is a Latvian footballer who plays as a midfielder for Daugavpils and the Latvia national team.

International career
Vengreviča made her debut for the Latvia national team on 30 November 2021, coming on as a substitute for Signija Šenberga against England.

References

1997 births
Living people
Women's association football midfielders
Latvian women's footballers
Latvia women's international footballers